Diphtheroptila brideliae is a moth of the family Gracillariidae. It is known from South Africa.

The larvae feed on Bridelia micrantha. They probably mine the leaves of their host plant.

References

Endemic moths of South Africa
Gracillariinae
Moths of Africa